Spier Falls is a waterfall on the Hudson River between Saratoga County and Warren County, New York. It is located east-southeast of the Village of Corinth. The Spier Falls Dam was built her to provide hydroelectric electricity.

References

Waterfalls of New York (state)
Landforms of Warren County, New York
Tourist attractions in Warren County, New York